Business rates in Northern Ireland are a tax on non-domestic property including offices, factories and shops.

In the 2020-2021 fiscal year, no rates were collected due to the COVID-19 pandemic.

All properties are to be revalued by 2023.

References

Taxation in the United Kingdom
Business in Northern Ireland
Property taxes